Himad Abdelli (born 17 November 1999) is a French professional footballer who plays as a midfielder for  club Angers.

Career
Abdelli made his professional debut for Le Havre in a 2–0 Coupe de la Ligue win over Troyes on 31 October 2018.

In June 2022, Abdelli signed a four-year contract with Angers.

Personal life
Born in France, Abdelli is of Algerian descent.

References

External links
 
 
 HAC Profile

1999 births
Living people
People from Montivilliers
Sportspeople from Seine-Maritime
Association football midfielders
French footballers
French sportspeople of Algerian descent
Le Havre AC players
Angers SCO players
Ligue 1 players
Ligue 2 players
Championnat National 2 players
Footballers from Normandy